Forever Young is the first mini album released by Sam Concepcion in commemoration of his 10th anniversary in the show business industry. It was released in September 2011 under Universal Records.

Background and release 
On April 30, 2011, Sam Concepcion was cast as the lead star of STAGES and Repertory Philippines’ production of Peter Pan that started its theatrical run from September 29 to October 30 at the Meralco Theater.

On September 15, Universal Records uploaded an audio sampler of Concepcion's newest single "Forever Young". The single was also the promotional single of "Peter Pan". It was then revealed that the new mini-album would contain the tracks from his previous mini-movie musical album Pop Class. Concepcion dropped the mini-album in late September.

Promotion 
Concepcion launched "Forever Young" on  Asap Rocks on September 18, 2011. The song instantly enjoyed massive support from the fans who made Concepcion and "Forever Young" two of the top trending topics on Twitter. Concepcion also attend series of mall shows to promote his new mini-album.

Music video 
The music video for the title track was uploaded through YouTube the same day he launched his mini-album on Asap Rocks.

Track listing

Release history

References

External links 
 Sam Concepcion Official Website

2011 albums
Sam Concepcion albums
Universal Records (Philippines) EPs